Eudonia asaleuta is a moth of the family Crambidae. It was described by Edward Meyrick in 1907. It is endemic to New Zealand and has been collected in the South Island in the West Coast, Fiordland,Canterbury, Otago and Southland regions. This species inhabits bare shingle areas as well as tussock habitat with few trees or scrub at altitudes of under 1000 m. Adults are on the wing from November to February.

Taxonomy
This species was first described by Edward Meyrick in 1907 using specimens collected at Lake Wakatipu by George Hudson and named Scoparia asaleuta. George Hudson discussed and illustrated this species in his book The butterflies and moths of New Zealand. In the 2010 the book The New Zealand Inventory of Biodiversity placed this species in the genus Eudonia. However some publications, subsequent to that book, continue to refer to this species as Scoparia asaleuta.

Description

Meyrick described this species as follows:

This species has forewings that a coloured a bluish grey with a sheen that camouflages the moth against rocks.

Distribution

This species is endemic to New Zealand. It has been found in the West Coast, Fiordland, Canterbury, Otago and Southland. In particular it has been collected in Lake Wakatipu, Aoraki / Mount Cook, Waiho River bed, Lake Manapouri, Hope Arm in Fiordland, Danseys Pass, Makarora and Invercargill.

Habitat
This species is known to inhabit open areas of bare shingle as well as tussock habitat with few trees or scrub at altitudes of under 1000 m.

Behaviour
The adults of this species are on the wing from November to February but are more common in January and February. This species has been collected in light traps, Malaise traps, and pan traps.

References

Moths described in 1907
Moths of New Zealand
Eudonia
Endemic fauna of New Zealand
Taxa named by Edward Meyrick
Endemic moths of New Zealand